The list of peaks in Rocky Mountain National Park includes the following:

References